The President of the Republic is a title used for heads of state and/or heads of government in countries having republican form of government.

Designation 

In most cases the president of a republic is elected, either:
 by direct universal suffrage (by all voters), or
 by indirect suffrage, or
 by a Parliament or one of its Chambers, or
 by an electoral college which may itself be designated.

Africa 

 :  President of Algeria, President of the People's Democratic Republic of Algeria since 1963
 :   President of Angola, President of the Republic of Angola since 1975
 :    President of Benin, President of the Republic of Benin since 1960
 : President of Botswana, President of the Republic of Botswana since 1966
 : President of Burkina Faso, President of the Republic of Burkina Faso since 1960
 :  President of Burundi, President of the Republic of Burundi since 1966
 : President of Cameroon, President of the Republic of Cameroon since 1960
 : President of Cape Verde, President of the Republic of Cape Verde since 1975
 : President of the Central African Republic since 1960, abolished in 1976, restored in 1979
 :     President of Chad, President of the Republic of Chad since 1962
 :  President of the Comoros, President of the Union of the Comoros since 1977
 : President of the Republic of the Congo since 1960
 : President of the Democratic Republic of the Congo since 1960
 : President of Djibouti, President of the Republic of Djibouti since 1977
 :    President of Egypt, President of the Arab Republic of Egypt since 1953
 : President of Equatorial Guinea, President of the Republic of Equatorial Guinea since 1968
 :  President of Eritrea, President of the State of Eritrea since 1993
 : President of Ethiopia, President of the Federal Democratic Republic of Ethiopia since 1974
 :    President of Gabon, President of the Gabonese Republic since 1960
 : President of the Gambia, President of the Republic of The Gambia since 1970
 :    President of Ghana, President of the Republic of Ghana since 1960
 :   President of Guinea, President of the Republic of Guinea since 1958
 : President of Guinea-Bissau, President of the Republic of Guinea-Bissau since 1973
 :  President of Ivory Coast, President of the Republic of Côte d'Ivoire since 1960
 :    President of Kenya, President of the Republic of Kenya since 1964
 :  President of Liberia, President of the Republic of Liberia since 1847
 : President of Madagascar, President of the Republic of Madagascar since 1959
 :   President of Malawi, President of the Republic of Malawi since 1966
 :     President of Mali, President of the Republic of Mali since 1965
 : President of Mauritania, President of the Islamic Republic of Mauritania since 1961
 : President of Mauritius, President of the Republic of Mauritius since 1992
 : President of Mozambique, President of the Republic of Mozambique since 1975
 :  President of Namibia, President of the Republic of Namibia since 1990
 :    President of Niger, President of the Republic of Niger since 1960
 :  President of Nigeria, President of the Federal Republic of Nigeria since 1963
 :   President of Rwanda, President of the Republic of Rwanda since 1961
 : President of the Sahrawi Arab Democratic Republic since 1982
 : President of São Tomé and Príncipe, President of the Democratic Republic of São Tomé and Príncipe since 1975
 :  President of Senegal, President of the Republic of Senegal since 1960
 :  President of Seychelles, President of the Republic of Seychelles since 1976
 : President of Sierra Leone, President of the Republic of Sierra Leone since 1971
 :  President of Somalia, President of the Federal Republic of Somalia since 1960
 : President of Somaliland, President of the Somaliland state of Somalia since 1991
 : President of South Africa, President of the Republic of South Africa since 1994 
 : President of South Sudan, President of the Republic of South Sudan since 2011
 :    President of Sudan, President of the Republic of Sudan since 1958
 : President of Tanzania, President of the United Republic of Tanzania since 1964
 :     President of Togo, President of the Togolese Republic since 1960
 :  President of Tunisia, President of the Republic of Tunisia since 1957
 :   President of Uganda, President of the Republic of Uganda since 1963
 :   President of Zambia, President of the Republic of Zambia since 1964
 : President of Zimbabwe, President of the Republic of Zimbabwe since 1980

Americas 

 : President of Argentina, Presidente de la Nación Argentina since 1826
 :  President of Barbados, President of Barbados since 2021
 :   President of Bolivia, Presidente del Estado Plurinacional de Bolivia since 1825
 :    President of Brazil, Presidente da República Federativa do Brasil since 1889
 :     President of Chile, Presidente de la República de Chile since 1826
 :  President of Colombia, Presidente de la República de Colombia since 1819
 : President of Costa Rica, Presidente de la República de Costa Rica since 1848
 :      President of Cuba, Presidente de la República de Cuba since 1902
 :  President of Dominica, President of the State of Dominica since 1978
 : President of the Dominican Republic, Presidente de la República Dominicana since 1844
 :   President of Ecuador, Presidente de la República del Ecuador since 1830
 : President of El Salvador, Presidente de la República de El Salvador since 1841
 : President of Guatemala, Presidente de la República de Guatemala since 1839
 :    President of Guyana, President of the Co-operative Republic of Guyana since 1970
 :     President of Haiti, Président de la République d'Haïti (French), Prezidan peyi Repiblik Ayiti (Creole) since 1807
 :  President of Honduras, Presidente de la República de Honduras since 1982
 :    President of Mexico, Presidente de los Estados Unidos Mexicanos 1824 to 1864 and since 1867
 : President of Nicaragua, Presidente de la República de Nicaragua since 1854
 :    President of Panama, Presidente de la República de Panamá since 1904
 :  President of Paraguay, Presidente de la República del Paraguay since 1844
 :      President of Peru, presidente de la República del Perú since 1823
 :  President of Suriname, President van de Republiek Suriname since 1975
 : President of Trinidad and Tobago, President of the Republic of Trinidad and Tobago since 1976
 : President of the United States of America since 1789
 :   President of Uruguay, Presidente de la República Oriental del Uruguay since 1830
 : President of Venezuela, Presidente de la República Bolivariana de Venezuela since 1830

Asia 

 : President of Bangladesh, গণপ্রজাতন্ত্রী বাংলাদেশের রাষ্ট্রপতি (Bengali), President of the People's Republic of Bangladesh (English) since 1971
 :      President of the People's Republic of China, 中华人民共和国主席 since 1954, abolished in 1975, restored in 1982
 : President of East Timor, Presidente da República Democrática de Timor-Leste or Prezidente Republika Demokratika Timor-Leste, President of the Democratic Republic of Timor-Leste since 2002
 :      President of India, भारत गणराज्य के राष्ट्रपति (Hindi), President of the Republic of India (English) since 1950
 :  President of Indonesia, Presiden Republik Indonesia since 1945
 :       President of Iran,  رییس‌جمهور ایران Rayis Jomhur-e Irān (Persian) since 1980
 :       President of Iraq, رئيس العراق Rayis aleiraq since 1958
 :    President of Israel, נשיא מדינת ישראל, President of the State of Israel since 1949
 : President of Kazakhstan, Қазақстан Республикасының Президенті, Qazaqstan Respwblïkasınıñ Prezïdenti since 1990
 : President of South Korea, 대한민국 대통령, President of the Republic of South Korea since 1948
 : President of Kyrgyzstan, Кыргыз Республикасынын Президенти or Президент Киргизской Республики, President of the Kyrgyz Republic since 1990
 :       President of Laos, President of the Lao People's Democratic Republic since 1975
 :  President of Lebanon, رئيس الجمهورية اللبنانية Rayiys aljumhuriat allubnania since 1926
 : President of the Maldives 1953-54 and since 1968
 : President of Mongolia, Монгол Улсын Ерөнхийлөгч, Mongol Ulsyn Yerönkhiilögch since 1990
 :  President of Myanmar, ပြည်ထောင်စု သမ္မတ မြန်မာနိုင်ငံတော်‌ သမ္မတ, President of the Republic of the Union of Myanmar since 1948
 :    President of Nepal, संघीय लोकतान्त्रिक गणतन्त्र नेपालका अध्यक्ष डा, President of the Federal Democratic Republic of Nepal since 2008
 :    President of Pakistan, صدر اسلامی جمہوریہ پاکستان (Urdu), President of the Islamic Republic of Pakistan (English) since 1956
 :   President of Palestine, رئيس دولة فلسطين Rayiys dawlat filastin since 1989
 : President of the Philippines, President of the Republic of the Philippines, "Pangulo ng Republika ng Pilipinas" (Filipino) since 1899
 :   President of Singapore, President of the Republic of Singapore since 1965
 :  President of Sri Lanka, ශ්‍රී ලංකා ජනාධිපති (Sinhalese), இலங்கை சனாதிபதி (Tamil) since 1972
 :      President of Syria, رئيس سوريا Rayis suria since 1946
 : President of the Republic of China, 中華民國總統 since 1912
 : President of Tajikistan, Президенти Тоҷикистон or Президент Таджикистана, President of the Republic of Tajikistan since 1990
 :    President of Turkey, Türkiye Cumhuriyeti Cumhurbaşkanı (President of the Republic of Turkey) since 1923
 : President of Turkmenistan, Türkmenistanyň ministrler kabinetiniň prezidenti we başlygy (Turkmen), President and chairman of the Cabinet of Ministers of Turkmenistan (English) since 1990
 : President of Uzbekistan, Oʻzbekiston Respublikasining Prezidenti since 1990
 :    President of Vietnam, President of the Socialist Republic of Vietnam since 1945
 :      President of Yemen, رئيس الجمهورية اليمنية Rayiys aljumhuriat alyamania since 1990

 Europe 

 :   President of Abkhazia, President of the Republic of Abkhazia since 1994
 :   President of Albania, Presidenti i Shqipërisë since 1991
 :    President of Armenia, Հայաստանի Հանրապետության նախագահ, President of the Republic of Armenia since 1991
 :    President of Artsakh, Արցախի հանրապետության նախագահ or Президент Нагорно-Карабахской Республики, President of the Republic of Artsakh since 1994
 :   President of Austria, Bundespräsident der Republik Österreich since 1920
 : President of Azerbaijan, President of the Republic of Azerbaijan since 1990
 :   President of Belarus, Прэзідэнт Рэспублікі Беларусь or Президент Республики Беларусь (President of the Republic of Belarus) since 1994
 :  President of Bulgaria, Президент на Република България since 1990 
 :   President of Croatia Predsjednik Republike Hrvatske since 1990
 :    President of Cyprus, Πρόεδρος της Κυπριακής Δημοκρατίας or Kıbrıs Cumhuriyeti Cumhurbaşkanı (President of the Republic of Cyprus) since 1960
:    President of the Czech Republic, Prezident České republiky (President of the Czech Republic) since 1993
 :   President of Estonia, Eesti Vabariigi President since 1992 (pre Soviet 1938)
 :   President of Finland, Tasavallan presidentti or Republikens president since 1919
 :    President of the French Republic, Président de la République Française 1848-52 and since 1870
 :   President of Georgia, საქართველოს პრეზიდენტი since 1991
 :   President of the Federal Republic of Germany, Bundespräsident der Bundesrepublik Deutschland (Federal President of the Federal Republic of Germany) 1949-90 for West Germany only, and since 1990 for all of Germany
 :    President of the Hellenic Republic, Πρόεδρος της Ελληνικής Δημοκρατίας (President of the Hellenic Republic) since 1973
 :   President of the Republic of Hungary, Köztársasági elnök since 1989
 :   President of Iceland, Forseti Íslands since 1944
 :   President of Ireland, Uachtarán na hÉireann since 1938
 :     President of the Italian Republic, Presidente della Repubblica Italiana since 1948
 :    President of Kosovo, Presidenti i Republikës së Kosovës or Председник Републике Косова, President of the Republic of Kosovo since 2008
 :    President of Latvia, Latvijas Valsts prezidents (Latvian), President of the Republic of Latvia since 1922
 : President of Lithuania, Lietuvos Respublikos Prezidentas (Lithuanian), President of the Republic of Lithuania since 1919
 :     President of Malta, President tar-Repubblika ta' Malta (Maltese), President of the Republic of Malta since 1974
 :   President of Moldova, Președintele Republicii Moldova (Romanian), President of the Republic of Romania since 1990
 : President of Montenegro, Предсједник Црне Горе since 1990
 : President of North Macedonia, Претседател на Република Северна Македонија or Presidenti i Republikës së Maqedonisë së Veriut, President of the Republic of North Macedonia since 1991
 : President of Northern Cyprus Kuzey Kıbrıs Türk Cumhuriyeti Cumhurbaşkanı since 1983
 : President of Poland, Prezydent Rzeczypospolitej Polskiej (President of the Republic of Poland) since 1922
 : President of the Portuguese Republic, Presidente da República Portuguesa since 1910
 :   President of Romania, Președintele României since 1974
 :    President of Russia, Президент Российской Федерации Prezident Rossiyskoy Federatsii since 1991
 :    President of Serbia, Председник Републике Србије Predsednik Republike Srbije since 1945
 :  President of the Slovak Republic, Prezident Slovenskej republiky since 1993
 :  President of Slovenia, Predsednik Republike Slovenije since 1991
 : President of South Ossetia, Хуссар Ирыстоны президент or Президент Южной Осетии, President of the Republic of South Ossetia since 1996
 : President of Switzerland, President of the Swiss Confederation since 1848
 : President of Transnistria, Președintele Republicii Moldovenești Nistrene or Прешединтеле Републичий Молдовенешть Нистрене, President of the Pridnestrovian Moldavian Republic since 1991
 :   President of Ukraine, Президент України since 1991

Oceania 

 :      President of Fiji, President of the Republic of Fiji since 1987
 : President of French Polynesia since 1984
 :  President of Kiribati, President of the Republic of Kiribati since 1979
 : President of the Marshall Islands, President of the Republic of the Marshall Islands since 1979
 : President of Micronesia, President of the Federated States of Micronesia since 1979
 :     President of Nauru, President of the Republic of Nauru since 1968
 :     President of Palau, President of the Republic of Palau since 1981
 :   President of Vanuatu, President of the Republic of Vanuatu since 1980

See also 

 Eternal President of the Republic

Heads of state